Ashton Michael (born July 4, 1982) is an American fashion designer and celebrity wardrobe stylist based in Los Angeles.

Career
In 2002, at age 19 Ashton started his first company with Marina Toybina called GLAZA.
His own label Ashton Michael was formed in 2005.

In 2010, Ashton showcased a green collection for NYFW. The spring collection was a collaboration with Rethink Sustainable Solutions Group.  All fabrics used to produce the collection were made from recycled water bottles, bamboo, and coconut.

In 2013, Ashton went to the East Coast to show his fall/winter 13 collection at Style 360 presented by Elle Magazine.

In October 2013, Ashton shut down the streets of Hollywood and built a runway in the middle of it for his show during LA Fashion Week for his spring/summer 2014 collection, Black Cross. Ashton Michael combined his black and white color palette, East LA street style and Hasidic Orthodox Jewish references as inspiration for the collection.

"ASH by Ashton Michael" is a ready-to-wear diffusion line launched by Ashton Michael in 2020.

In 2015, Ashton Michael created a black and pink army for Beyoncé & Nicki Minaj TIDAL performance.

Ashton Michael has designed for numerous celebrities including Adam Lambert, Will.i.am, Usher, Nicki Minaj, Cher, Justin Bieber, Pitbull, Samuel Larsen, and Lizzo

Ashton Michael works from Hollywood, California.

Television appearances
In 2013, Ashton Michael appeared as a guest judge on America's Next Top Model and RuPaul's Drag U. Ashton also appeared as a makeover consultant on the E! show Opening Act.

Released in 2020, Ashton Michael appeared as a contestant on the first season of the Netflix reality show and fashion design competition Next In Fashion. During the team portion of the program, he collaborated with Marco Morante of the brand Marco Marco, fellow LA-based designer and long-time friend. Ashton was eliminated in the semifinal of the competition.

References

External links 
 Ashton Michael's official website
 Ashton Michael on Facebook
 Ashton Michael on Twitter
 Ashton Michael on Instagram
 Instagram for the ready-to-wear line Ash by Ashton Michael
 Ashton Michael on PAPER Magazine
 Ashton Hirota on Fashion Net

1982 births
Living people
American fashion designers
People from Los Angeles